VWO may refer to: 

 Vlaamse Wiskunde Olympiade, a Flemish mathematics competition
 Voorbereidend wetenschappelijk onderwijs, a Dutch school system
 Voluntary welfare organisation, charitable organisation